Carspach is a commune in the Haut-Rhin department in Alsace in north-eastern France.

Etymology
Carspach has historically been attested as Charoltespach in 877 and Karolspach in 1266. The toponym Carspach is of Germanic origin, deriving from the anthroponym Charoald. The Germanic hydronym *-bak(i) entered the French language via High German, and took on two forms: the Germanic form -bach and Romantic -bais.

See also
 Communes of the Haut-Rhin department

References

Communes of Haut-Rhin